USS William M. Wood (DE-557) was a proposed World War II United States Navy John C. Butler-class destroyer escort that was never built.

William M. Wood was to have been built at the Boston Navy Yard in Boston, Massachusetts. Her construction contract was cancelled on 10 June 1944.

The name William M. Wood was reassigned to the destroyer USS William M. Wood (DD-715).

References

Navsource Naval History: Photographic History of the U.S. Navy: Destroyer Escorts, Frigates, Littoral Warfare Vessels

John C. Butler-class destroyer escorts
Cancelled ships of the United States Navy